Pinguicula grandiflora, commonly known as the large-flowered butterwort, is a temperate insectivorous plant in the Lentibulariaceae family. One distinguishing feature of the species is its flower, which is much larger than the average for the genus.

The plant is native to parts of Europe; such as France, Ireland, Spain and Switzerland, 
It is not native to Great Britain, but has been introduced in a few places in England and Wales. It has also been introduced to Czechoslovakia.

There are 2 known subspecies;
 Pinguicula grandiflora subsp. grandiflora
 Pinguicula grandiflora subsp. rosea

References

Carnivorous plants of Europe
grandiflora
Flora of Great Britain
Flora of Ireland
Flora of France
Flora of Spain
Flora of Andorra
Flora of Switzerland

Plants described in 1789